Clean Break is a best-selling children's novel by Jacqueline Wilson, first published in the United Kingdom in 2005. It deals with the consequences of a father abandoning his family.

Plot summary
The main character is a young girl named Emily, who lives with her mother Julie, her half sister Vita, and her half brother Maxie in their grandmother Ellen's house. Although her dad is technically only her stepfather, Em and her siblings all love him completely. Em is highly sensitive and is very insecure about her weight. On Christmas Day, Em, Vita and Maxie receive their presents. Vita receives a reindeer hand-puppet called Dancer (owing to the reindeer wearing a tutu and ballet shoes), Maxie gets a set of Caran D'Ache felt tip pens and Em gets an 'emerald' ring.

Later that day Em overhears a conversation her dad is having and realises that he is having a secret affair. Em confronts her father, and he owns up to his cheating, and by the next morning he has left.

After Em's step-dad walks out, the rest of the family struggle to get along without him. Em, Vita and Maxie are all convinced that Dad will come back. Dad later calls Mum to tell her that he will be taking the kids out on New Year's Day.

On New Year's Day, the children go and visit their father, Frankie, at the home of his new partner Sarah, but she is rude, selfish and obnoxious. On a visit they take to a park, Em, Vita and Maxie are astounded to find their Dad passionately kissing Sarah, in a way that he would never do to their mum. Sarah is an aspiring actress and both she and Frankie move to Scotland quite soon into their relationship. When they arrive home, they all reject their Dad's goodbyes.

The children all tell their mother that Sarah and their Dad don't get on very well, and will be home soon. Their Mum is quite depressed, and dependent on Frankie for emotional support.
Their grandmother does not understand how much the family all love him and would take him back if he ever returned. Emily runs into her biological dad at a fair, and was scared because he had always abused her mother when she was young. Em's Gran decides to take them on a holiday and gets a boyfriend herself. Em also finds that she is good at swimming while on holiday and later takes up swimming classes when she gets home.

When Em travels to London to meet her favourite author, the family runs into Frankie again, as he has apparently broken up with Sarah and found a new girlfriend, Hannah, before moving back to London. Emily runs after Frankie, falls and breaks her arm and Dancer (Vita's reindeer puppet), but her dad stops and takes her to the hospital.

The story ends on Christmas Eve just under one year after Frankie left, with Frankie sending Dancer back to them as a Christmas present. Somebody taps on the door pretending to be Father Christmas. The book finishes with the line "It looked like it was going to be the best Christmas ever", implying that her stepfather has returned.

Characters
Emily (Em) – The main character. She loves reading, making up stories about Dancer, Vita's reindeer puppet, and her special emerald ring. She is the narrator of the story. She is a little overweight but has lovely blonde hair. She has a very gentle, soft nature and wants nothing more than for her beloved siblings, Maxie and Vita, to feel safe and loved. Emily's father nicknames her Emerald, thought to be having emerald green eyes. Emily loves her father very dearly, and when he leaves the lovely, sweet family to be with his new girlfriend, named Sarah, she feels as if her home is now just a house, her smile is now just an expression, and love is now just a word to everyone but her. She is ever so sensitive to other's emotions, and when she discovers Maxie truly remembers Dad, she describes the scenario as "nearly making her cry, too". 

Vita – Em's half sister. She has a reindeer puppet called Dancer. She has mousy brown hair and likes to be fashionable. Vita sometimes laughs at poor Em's size, but when a shadow of sadness is cast over their family, she turns to Emily for support, and one lonely night, Em finds poor Vita crying alone in bed, and used her lovely, soft reindeer puppet named Dancer to cheer Vita up. 

Maxie – Em's wimpy half brother who was given a set of expensive felt tip pens for Christmas. He potentially has a developmental disability—for example he does not want to sleep in a proper bed, he hates pyjamas, and is a fussy eater due to sensory issues. When sadness breaks up their family, he covers up his emotions by pretending he's forgotten all about his father. However, one day, Em finds that the reason his special felt tips are all dried up even though she rarely ever sees him drawing is because he is writing letters to his beloved Dad. Maxie is very innocent and loves his family with all of his heart. 

Julie (Mum) – Em, Vita and Maxie's mum. She has a warm and optimistic disposition, but when the shadow of deep sadness is cast over her family, it's almost like there is a grey rain cloud following around all of the time. She begins losing weight and quickly becomes an unhealthily low body weight. Em often sadly says she hears her dear mother crying in bed during the night. Sometimes, under such stressful and upsetting conditions, Mum's emotions lead her to say things she doesn't truly mean, but she really loves her children and wants them to have a nice, warm childhood, despite their situation. 

Frankie (Dad) – Em's stepdad. Walks out on the family on Boxing Day to live with his new partner, Sarah. He is very affectionate and caring, yet what puzzles Em as much as us is that suddenly, he falls out of love with his wife, and their home is no longer special and loving. He apologises all the time, and he really means it, but he never explains why he left. Sometimes his children wonder if it's because he no longer loves them, and when they ask him if that is true he begins to cry and cuddles them close. 

Ellen (Gran) – Em, Vita and Maxie's grandmother and Julie's mother who tends to get very stroppy at times. However, she really wants the very best for her family, and seeing her beloved daughter and grandchildren feeling so sad and hopeless is purely heartbreaking for her. She holds a strong grudge against Frankie (their Dad), but she also wishes she could wave a magic wand and make everything alright.

Dancer – Vita's reindeer puppet.

Jenny and Yvonne – Em's friends.

Mrs Marks – Em's teacher.

Jenna Williams – Em's favourite author, who makes an appearance in the book.  Jacqueline Wilson has said that this character is based on herself.

Sarah – The woman that Dad is discovered to be cheating with. When Em, Vita and Maxie meet her, she is obnoxious and rude. She is very skinny, has cropped black hair, and bites her nails. Em can barely fit in her clothes and they squeeze Em in all the wrong areas, making her look very fat.

Reception
The Observer wrote "Jacqueline Wilson's particular talent is to find a bittersweetness in the dysfunctional families she describes.  In Clean Break, she commutes between love and desertion, fun and responsibility. She is especially good at writing about the gallantry of children, their determination to go on being children and having fun. But, at the same time, her children ... are often compelled to be more mature than their guardians." and Booktrust commented "Jacqueline Wilson proves once again why, as one of the most highly-gifted and most resonant voices in contemporary children's literature, she is also deservedly one of the best-loved."

References

2005 British novels
British children's novels
Novels by Jacqueline Wilson
Doubleday (publisher) books
Spain in fiction
Novels set in London
2005 children's books